David Rodney Fane  (born 28 December 1966) is a New Zealand actor of Samoan descent.

Early life and education
Fane was educated at St. Pauls College in Grey Lynn.

Career
Fane got into acting quite late and trained at the New Zealand Drama School Toi Whakaari, graduating with a Diploma in Acting in 1992, which he upgraded to a Bachelor of Performing Arts (Acting) in 2003.

He first appeared on television in a sketch comedy show called SKITZ alongside future Naked Samoans Oscar Kightley and Robbie Magasiva. He then did the sitcom spinoff "The Semisis" in which he played the father and the minister. In 2004 he performed in a play written by Oscar Kightley and Dave Andrews called Niu Sila. The play won the Chapman Tripp Theatre Award for Outstanding New Zealand Play of the Year. Fane was a founding member of Naked Samoans. He played a leading role in Sione's Wedding. Other roles include parts in The Tattooist, bro'Town, Outrageous Fortune and the lead role in Diplomatic Immunity.

Fane is part host on the TV2 series "Island Wars" and morning host for the New Zealand radio station Flava 95.8 for 10 years.

In 2016, Fane was awarded the Emerging Pacific Artist award with Oscar Kightley at the Creative New Zealand Arts Pasifka Awards. In the 2023 New Year Honours, Fane was appointed an Officer of the New Zealand Order of Merit, for services to the performing arts.

Controversy
In 2010, at the inaugural Radio Roast Fane pushed insult comedy boundaries when roasting advertising executives in front of a celebrity audience. He said that "Hitler had a right", people living with HIV deserved to be "roasted", and "Jews were expendable". The media, taking the incident out of context, suggested it was a drunken tirade when in fact it was in line with the theme of the night, a risque comedy Roast and Fane was explicitly instructed on what line to take. Fane abjectly apologised to the New Zealand AIDS Foundation (NZAF) and New Zealand Jewish Council. Both organisations accepted his apology on behalf of their communities.

Filmography

Film

Television

References

External links
Dave Fane at tvnz.co.nz

David Fane profile on NZ On Screen

1966 births
New Zealand people of Samoan descent
Actors of Samoan descent
New Zealand male film actors
New Zealand male television actors
People educated at St Paul's College, Auckland
Living people
Toi Whakaari alumni
Indigenous actors
Actors from Auckland
Officers of the New Zealand Order of Merit